Josiah Bartlett (1729–1795) was an American physician and revolutionary.

Josiah Bartlett may also refer to:

Josiah Bartlett Jr. (1767–1838), American politician
Josiah Bartlet, a character in the television series The West Wing